There are two different calculi that use the name rho-calculus:

 The first is a formalism intended to combine the higher-order facilities of lambda calculus with the pattern matching of term rewriting.

 The second is a reflective higher-order variant of the asynchronous polyadic pi calculus.

References

Lambda calculus